The 1974 Miami Hurricanes football team represented the University of Miami as an independent during the 1974 NCAA Division I football season. Led by Pete Elliott in his second and final year as head coach, the Hurricanes played their home games at the Miami Orange Bowl in Miami, Florida. Miami finished the season with a record of 6–5.

Schedule

Roster
DB Mike Archer
WR Rick Bernstein

References

Miami
Miami Hurricanes football seasons
Miami Hurricanes football